In Greek mythology, Cassandra (Ancient Greek: Κασσάνδρα Kassandra, also ) may refer to two women:

 Cassandra, a Trojan princess as daughter of King Priam and Hecuba.
 Cassandra, another name for Philonoe, wife of Bellerophon. Otherwise, she was also known under several other names: Alkimedousa, Anticleia, or Pasandra. By the hero, Cassandra became the mother of Isander (Peisander), Hippolochus and Laodamia.

Notes

References 

 Apollodorus, The Library with an English Translation by Sir James George Frazer, F.B.A., F.R.S. in 2 Volumes, Cambridge, MA, Harvard University Press; London, William Heinemann Ltd. 1921. ISBN 0-674-99135-4. Online version at the Perseus Digital Library. Greek text available from the same website.
 Strabo, The Geography of Strabo. Edition by H.L. Jones. Cambridge, Mass.: Harvard University Press; London: William Heinemann, Ltd. 1924. Online version at the Perseus Digital Library.
 Strabo, Geographica edited by A. Meineke. Leipzig: Teubner. 1877. Greek text available at the Perseus Digital Library.

Princesses in Greek mythology